is a funicular and cable car station in Tateyama, Nakaniikawa District, Toyama Prefecture, Japan.

Lines
Tateyama Kurobe Kankō
Tateyama Ropeway (Tateyama Kurobe Alpine Route)
Kurobe Cable Car (Tateyama Kurobe Alpine Route)

Adjacent stations

References

Railway stations in Toyama Prefecture
Tateyama, Toyama